Alexander Brown FRSE FRSSAf (1878–1947) was a Scottish-born mathematician and educator in South Africa. He contributed to the study of the ratio of incommensurables in geometry and relations between the distances of a point from three vertices of a regular polygon.

Career
Brown was born in Dalkeith, near Edinburgh, Scotland on 5 May 1878. He attended Newton Public School and then George Watson's College, where he was the winner of the Wright Bursary in his final year. He matriculated at the University of Edinburgh in 1893 where he obtained a MA (Mathematics and Natural Science)(First Class) and a BSc (Mathematics and Natural Science)(Special Distinction) in 1897. While at Edinburgh University he held the first Heriot Bursary and Mackay Smith scholarship. On completion of his degrees he won the Vans Dunlop scholarship, the Baxter scholarship and the Drummond scholarship.

He was mathematical master at the High School of Dundee from 1897 to 1899. In 1899 he won the Ferguson Scholarship in Mathematics and he went to Gonville and Caius College, Cambridge where he obtained a First Class in Mathematics in 1902.

In 1903 he became Deputy Professor of Applied Mathematics and Physics for one year at the South African College, Cape Town in the absence of the holder of the chair, Carruthers Beattie, who was on a year-long magnetic survey of South Africa. In recognition of Brown's exceptional work during that year the College Council split the Chair and Beattie was offered the professorship of Physics while Brown was offered the professorship of Mathematics. He retained this position until his death on 27 January 1947.

He was elected a Fellow of the Royal Society of Edinburgh in 1907. His proposers were George Chrystal, Arthur John Pressland, John Sturgeon Mackay and John Alison. In 1918 he was elected a Fellow of the Royal Society of South Africa.

Personal life
He married Mary Graham in 1911 and they had a daughter and a son. In his leisure time he was a great reader and a keen musician.

Works
He contributed to the study of the ratio of incommensurables in geometry and relations between the distances of a point from three vertices of a regular polygon. His paper on this subject was read before the Edinburgh Mathematical Society on 11 June 1909.

Selected publications
Brown, A. (1905) "Convergence of a Reversed Power Series" British Association Report
Brown, A. (1907) "Examination of the Validity of an Approximate Solution of a Certain Velocity Equation" Transaction of the South African Philosophical Society, vol xvi, pt. 3
Brown, A. (1916) "The Equivalent Mass of a Spring Vibrating Longitudinally" Transactions of the Royal Society of South Africa  vol. v, p. 565.
Brown, A. (1916) "The Arrangement of Successive Convergents in the Order of Accuracy" Transactions of the Royal Society of South Africa  vol. v, p. 653.
Brown, A. (1916) "The Use of a Standard Parabola for Drawing Diagrams of Bending Moment and of Shear in a Beam Uniformly Loaded" Transactions of the Royal Society of South Africa vol. v, p. 659.

External links
Alexander Brown Obituary notice in Transactions of the Royal Society of South Africa
Biography of Alexander Brown on MacTutor

References 

1878 births
1947 deaths
Fellows of the Royal Society of Edinburgh
Fellows of the Royal Society of South Africa
British mathematicians
19th-century Scottish people
20th-century Scottish people
Academic staff of the University of Cape Town
Alumni of the University of Edinburgh
Alumni of Gonville and Caius College, Cambridge
Emigrants from the United Kingdom to Cape Colony